Monikura Tikinau (born 3 January 1990) is a New Zealand rugby league footballer who joined the Redcliffe Dolphins in 2011, and who play in the Queensland Cup.

He formerly played for the Wests Tigers in the Toyota Cup.

Representative career
Tikinau is a Cook Islands international and was part of the Cook Islands team that lost the 2009 Pacific Cup grand final.

References

External links
Wests Tigers profile
2009 Pacific Cup Squads

1990 births
Living people
Cook Islands national rugby league team players
New Zealand rugby league players
New Zealand sportspeople of Cook Island descent
Redcliffe Dolphins players
Rugby league second-rows
Rugby league locks
Rugby league players from Auckland
Rugby league wingers
Rugby league centres